Aeriscardovia aeriphila is a species of bacteria in the phylum Actinomycetota.

Etymology

The name Aeriscardovia derives from: Latin masculine gender noun aer aeris, air; New Latin feminine gender noun Scardovia, a bacterial generic name to honor Vittorio Scardovi, an Italian microbiologist; New Latin feminine gender noun Aeriscardovia, cells similar to the genus Scardovia that can grow in air.

The species epithet (aeriphila) drives from: Latin masculine gender noun aer aeris, air; New Latin adjective philus from Greek adjective philos (φίλος) meaning friend, loving; New Latin feminine gender adjective aeriphila, air-loving.)

See also
 Bacterial taxonomy
 Microbiology

References 

Bacteria described in 2004
Bifidobacteriales
Monotypic bacteria genera